Saccharibacillus sacchari is a Gram-variable, rod-shaped, and facultatively anaerobic bacterium from the genus Saccharibacillus, which has been isolated from the plant Saccharum officinarum.

References

Paenibacillaceae
Bacteria described in 2008